Hivjufossen is a 250 meters high waterfall in Hovet, a village in the municipality of Hol in the province Viken, in Norway.

Some kilometers from the centre of the village Hovet, in the direction of Aurland, is a hiking track to the Hivjufossen. The majestic waterfall is a tourist attraction and can only be reached after 40 till 60 minutes climbing. Hivjufossen consists of an upper and lower waterfall which are created by the water of the river Storekvelvi that streams from Hardangervidda National Park to Hallingskarvet National Park. It is joined by other rivers and streams as it flows in the direction of the river Storåne in Hovet.

Deadly accidents
The waterfall came in the news when on 3 August 2007 a Dutchman (40) accidentally fell into the waterfall and was found dead some hours later. The first deadly accident took place in 1991. The victim was a Norwegian woman (44). The third victim was an American (52).

The fatal fall happened on 24 July 2016.  Magne Holestøl, local guide,  experienced travel guide of tourists who visit the Hivjufossen and member of the rescue team in 1991, stated in the article "Ikke trygt for turister" in the provincial newspaper NRK Buskerud  Hivjufossen is not safe for tourists.

Gallery

References

Literature
Ciska Zeypveld  (2013)  De dag dat je uit mijn leven viel (The day you fell out of my life")  Publisher: Utrecht: Voorhoeve

External links
 Reformatorisch Dagblad, 10 April 2013 - Jonge weduwe beschrijft leven na verongelukken man 
 NRK Buskerud, 24 July 2016  - Redningsaksjon etter mann i foss 
 NRK Buskerud, 25 July 2017 -  Mann fortsatt savnet etter fall i foss i Hallingdal 
 The Salt Lake Tribune, 26 July 2016 - Utah defense attorney believed dead from Norwegian waterfall slip 
 The Salt Lake Tribune, 26 July 2016 - 'He leaves a huge hole behind' 
 NRK Buskerud, 25 July 2016 - Familien uten håp 
 NRK Buskerud, 25 July 2016 - Ikke trygt for turister
 NRK Buskerud, 27 July 2016 - Familien uten håp 
 NRK Buskerud, 30 July 2016 - Vi kjemper litt mot naturkreftene nå 
 NRK Buskerud, 3 August 2016 - Død person funnet i Hivjufossen 
 The Salt Lake Tribune, 5 August 2016 - Body recovered from Norwegian waterfall believed that of missing Utah attorney Kent Hart

  

Waterfalls of Norway
Hol
Viken (county)